FTG (Freedom That's Gone) is a thrash metal band from Malaysia. They are among the earliest to appear at the end of the era of the first generation of underground music Malaysia such as Nemesis, Punisher and others.

History

FTG originally was a group of musicians, studio musicians who worked as a studio sessionist in FGM (Family Group Malaysia) which formerly managed by pop artists such as Zaiton Sameon, Byahh and ingrid and Eddie Hamid.

EP were recording their first overtones "Thrash Metal" Malaysia is the first released to the market. IT releasing by FGM since 1992. A few weeks later a record company called VSP also produce Cromok demo-EP, "Image of Purity" (a record in Woolongong, Sydney, Australia). Both recording becomes the starting point for the recordings that thrash metal in the Malaysian music industry.

FTG Group to highlight the image Thrash metal and very popular funfair nationwide. Lately they prefer taking the direction of music but still maintain agressif less reluctant metal music itself. They also tend to produce the album in Malay language, and no longer use the English language.

After the album "To The Front", vocalist Bart left the band and was replaced by Tajul. Although some criticize the inclusion of the new vocalist, but they will produce their first album with new vocalist Tajul that "I am not Care" and not until a week that criticized the album reach sales of 50 thousand units, and also a platinum award.

At the end of 2006, the original bass player, Mie (also known as Mie FTG) started playing bass for a reggae band, Pure Vibracion. In 2008, Hashim from Sil Khannaz replace him as the bass player templates sessionist.

Members
Current line-up
 Tajul – vocal
 Mohd Isa Mohd Rafli (Jac) – guitar
 Mohd Nizam Mohd Shariff (Zam) – drum
 Hashim Pestilence lkojhhh
– bass (Sil Khannaz, Brain Dead, Damien, The Pilgrims)

Former line-up
 Allahyarham Ibat Karim (Bart)- vocal
 Azmie Ibrahim – bass (Pure Vibracion)

Discography

EPs
 Freedom That's Gone
(1991)
rr

Studio album
 After The Promise (1992)
 Spirit To Rebel (1994)
 To The Front (1996)
 Aku Tak Peduli (1998)
 Made in Malaysia (1999)
 FTG (2000)
 Made in Malaysia Vol.2 (2001)
 Reborn (2002)
 Stop This Madness (2004)
 Kuasa (2006)
 Kau Jangan Kurang Ajar (2019)

Live album
 Live at Metal Wars (1999)

Compilation album
 Stronger Than Steel – The Best Of FTG (1998)
 Cromok & FTG (2000)
 Kompilasi Terbaik FTG & Sil Khannaz (2001)
 FTG rage D' Cromok (2006)

Reference

External links
 Official MySpace
  Album Sulung Kumpulan FTG "After The Promise" Di Keluarkan Semula Dalam Bentuk Piring Hitam

Malaysian thrash metal musical groups
Musical groups established in 1989